Adriano Andreani (14 September 1879 – 20 October 1960) was an Italian gymnast. He competed in the men's team event at the 1908 Summer Olympics.

References

Other websites
 
 
 

1879 births
1960 deaths
Italian male artistic gymnasts
Olympic gymnasts of Italy
Gymnasts at the 1908 Summer Olympics
Sportspeople from Ferrara